Lucius Furius was a Roman commander who aided Publius Varinius and Lucius Cossinius against Spartacus in the Third Servile War.

Third Servile War

Film Portrayals
Furius was portrayed by Jared Turner in the Starz original series Spartacus: War of the Damned.

See also
 Crisis of the Roman Republic

1st-century BC Romans
Third Servile War
73 BC deaths
Year of birth unknown